1 Corinthians 1 is the first chapter of the First Epistle to the Corinthians in the New Testament of the Christian Bible. It is authored by Paul the Apostle and Sosthenes in Ephesus, composed between 52–55 CE, and sent to the church in Corinth.

Text

The original text was written in Koine Greek. This chapter is divided into 31 verses.

Textual witnesses
Some early manuscripts containing the text of this chapter are:
 Codex Vaticanus (AD 325–350)
 Codex Sinaiticus (330–360)
 Codex Alexandrinus (400–440)
 Codex Ephraemi Rescriptus (~450; extant verses 3–31)
 Papyrus 14 (6th century; extant verses 25–27)
 Papyrus 11 (7th century; extant verses 17–22)

Old Testament references
 1 Corinthians 1:19 references Isaiah 29:14
 1 Corinthians 1:31 references Jeremiah 9:24

Opening greeting (1:1–3)

Verse 1

"The salutation with my own hand—Paul's" in 1 Corinthians 16:21 suggests that the majority of the letter may have actually been scribed by someone else, and therefore many interpreters suggest that Sosthenes was the amanuensis of the Epistle.

The address and greeting which open the Epistle conclude with the words "Grace be unto you, and peace".

Thanksgiving for Christ's total sufficiency (1:4–9)
In the section of thanksgiving, Paul usually signals the issues to be dealt later in the letter, but he can always give thanks because God's sufficiency can resolve all problem in the person of his Son, Jesus Christ.

The divisiveness of idolizing Christian teachers (1:10–17a)
The disciples or pupils of a secular teacher must give exclusive loyalty to the teacher, and the Corinthians who were converted and baptized through the ministry of different teachers also perceived themselves in the secular way, that they engaged in quarrels over the merits of those teachers. Paul states this loyalty as idolatrous and wants them to follow the Messiah, not his servants.

Verse 12

"Each of you says": Gill notes that Paul may have gotten the report from "the house of Chloe" regarding the schism among the church members.
"I am of Paul": Paul had been instrumental in the conversion and baptism of some members of the Corinthian church, as he was the first to lay the foundation of a Gospel church in this city.
"I am of Apollos": Apollos came to Corinth after Paul left. As an eloquent man with good knowledge of the Scriptures, he may have attracted many church members with his way of preaching.
"I am of Cephas" (or Simon Peter): Unlike Paul and Apollos, Peter was with Christ from the beginning, witnessing his miracles, hearing his doctrines, and having the apostleship. On these accounts, the church members highly valued him and the converted Jews among them, who still retained a regard to the ceremonies of the law, may have fixed on Peter as their minister.
"I am of Christ": taking Paul's words, some may have declared that they should not "be called by any other name than that of Christ". These people were "for Christ", not of Paul, Apollos, Cephas, or any other ministers of the word, but could still be "blame worthy" when they use Christ's name to deceive men or divide his interest. Some authorities to the contrary have suggested that the Christ of this passage is a copying error and for example the noted Jewish historian Graetz says that that person is really Chrestus of Suetonius in Claudius 25 who provoked a "tumult" in Rome near the 49th year of the Christian era.

Boasting in the Lord and not in the educated elite (1:17b–31)
Orators or public speakers in the first century generally produce carefully crafted speeches to draw the attention or bewitch the hearers, based on the performance only, not the content, but Paul used none of the tricks ("with words of human wisdom") when he preach the gospel of Christ. Jesus sent Paul to preach the gospel, with its content "the cross of Christ", not to secure a personal following. Paul asks the Corinthians to reflect on the secular status or class of the messengers of God's wisdom, who are 'the foolish', whom secular society regarded as 'nobodies' as opposed to the 'elite' who in the first century were described  as 'wise, influential in political sphere and well-born'.

The power of God
Paul speaks of the power of God in this letter (1 Corinthians 1:18, 25) and in his letter to the Romans (Romans 1:16), mirroring Jesus' debates on the subject of the resurrection with the Sadducees in the gospels, who he says "do not know the scriptures [or] the power of God" (Matthew 22:29; Mark 12:24).

Verse 31

Other texts replace "glories" (KJV: "glorieth") with "boasts". Paul quotes from the Septuagint version of Jeremiah 9:23–24 in the Old Testament, "abbreviating quite freely" from the longer text:

See also 

 Related Bible parts: Psalm 34, Psalm 44, Isaiah 29, Jeremiah 9, Acts 18, 2 Corinthians 10

References

Sources

External links 
 King James Bible - Wikisource
English Translation with Parallel Latin Vulgate
Online Bible at GospelHall.org (ESV, KJV, Darby, American Standard Version, Bible in Basic English)
Multiple bible versions at Bible Gateway (NKJV, NIV, NRSV etc.)

01